In Our Time is a radio discussion programme exploring a wide variety of historical, scientific, cultural, religious and philosophical topics, broadcast on BBC Radio 4 in the United Kingdom since 1998 and hosted by Melvyn Bragg. Since 2011, all episodes have been available to download as individual podcasts.

Programmes

1998–1999

1999–2000
From 6 April 2000, with the discussion on "The Natural Order", the programme moved from 30 minutes to a 45-minute format.

2000–2001

2001–2002

2002–2003

2003–2004

2004–2005
In 2005 listeners were invited to vote in a poll for the greatest philosopher in history. The winner was the subject of the final programme before the summer break. The result of the vote was:
 Karl Marx (with 27.9% of the votes)
 David Hume (12.7%)
 Ludwig Wittgenstein (6.8%)
 Friedrich Nietzsche (6.5%)
 Plato (5.6%)
 Immanuel Kant (5.6%)
 Thomas Aquinas (4.8%)
 Socrates (4.8%)
 Aristotle (4.5%)
 Karl Popper (4.2%)

2005–2006

2006–2007

2007–2008

2008–2009

2009–2010

2010–2011

2011–2012

2012–2013

2013–2014

2014–2015

2015–2016

From the start of 2016 (Saturn) the podcast version of the programme started to include a few minutes of unbroadcast extra material, which would generally be prompted by the question So, what did we miss?

2016–2017

2017–2018

2018–2019

2019–2020

The 2019–2020 series was truncated because of the COVID-19 pandemic.

2020–2021

2021–2022

2022–2023

References

External links
 Programme archive

In Our
In our
Educational broadcasting in the United Kingdom
In Our Time
In Our Time programmes